Orlane Ahanda (born 20 November 1998) is a French handball player who plays for Neptunes de Nantes and the French national team.

References

External links

1998 births
Living people
French female handball players